Serhii Petrov (born 1976, Kharkiv, Ukraine), known professionally as Bob Basset, is a Ukrainian artist and a co-founder of an art studio under the same name.

The studio creates wearable art pieces such as masks, bags, clutches, bracelets, cases, and more in the techno-romanticism genre. Artist works primarily with leather, metal, stone, wood, bone, ceramic, and glass. Over the years, leather masks have become his main object of artistic practice, and they have been used in a variety of arenas. Bob Basset items have been exhibited all over the world, often as main attributes at Fashion Week shows and at exhibitions and projects, including the International Museum Day. Collectors from different countries often buy Bob Basset masks for their private collections.

The studio was co-founded in 1989 by Serhii Petrov and his brother, Oleg, in Kharkiv, Ukraine. After Oleg's death in 2011, Serhii Petrov became the face, main artist, and manager of the brand.

In 2016, Bob Basset was included in a list of nine revolutionary Ukrainian designers. The studio's items were highly appraised by the founder of the steampunk style, William Gibson, filmmaker and artist David Lynch, and post-cyberpunk and science fiction author Cory Doctorow. Bob Basset created masks and other items for the Givenchy brand and stylists Panos Yiapanis and Riccardo Tisci. The studio also worked with the Ukrainian brands sasha.kanevski and L'UVE (partnering with the designer Valeria Kovalska). A mask from the Bob Basset collection "Mashrabiya" was used in Hollywood actress Elizabeth Banks' photo shoot. A number of Bob Basset masks were created for a movie produced by Ridley Scott Associates (RSA Films) and Michael Bay, for the movie Metallica: Through the Never, and were used to promote the American TV show The Last Ship. Bob Basset masks were used in a number of music videos for bands and artists. From 2013, Bob Basset creates masks for Sid Wilson from the music band Slipknot; the studio also worked with Metallica, Korn, Avril Lavigne, Otep, Tantric, Zayn, British DJ Jungleboi, Dutch DJ R3hab, Beissoul & Einius, Ghost. Bob Basset created gaming design pieces for the international company Plarium, and a mask for the Iron Custom Motocycles speed record project.

Bob Basset have appeared in the media Vogue International (USA), The New York Times (USA), The New York Times Fashion Magazine (USA), Flaunt (USA), WAD (France), Vice U.K. (UK), Bizarre (UK), INSIDE Artzine (Germany), Trendson magazine (Hong-Kong), Dazed (UK), METCHA, Wired Italia (Italy), and others.

Bob Basset also created personal collections: "Mashrabiya" (2014), "Survivors" (2015), "Calvary" (or "Golgotha") (2016), and "Turnskin" (2019).

Art

Style, working process and materials

Techno-romanticism

From the start, Bob Basset creations were seen as steampunk in style, and later he was referred to as a "steampunk guru." However, the Petrov brothers considered themselves the founders of their own style: "techno-romanticism."

Over the years, Bob Basset became known as "techno-romanticism pioneer." Serhii Petrov often describes his studio pieces as "real objects from unreal worlds."

Techno-romanticism doesn't have straightforward rules, so the artist is free to mix different styles, items, and materials. The style involves idealization of the technology and mechanics and romanticization of the creative process and its result.

Working process and team growth

Petrov considers everything around him an inspiration for his work, from human emotions to objects and nature. He is passionate about experimenting with technology and seeking new skills. He doesn't draw primary sketches, but starts to make an object at once after working with the material and understanding its qualities, because of his belief that "a tool has a great influence on the result." 

The manufacture of one mask can take from ten hours to a year. To create  a mask not only esthetically pleasing but also comfortable to wear, Petrov thinks through the ventilation system and sometimes arranges trials to see how long a person can wear it easily.

The studio has a team of four to six assistant designers, but the number of people involved on a certain project depends on the task. In general, Serhii doesn't let outsiders visit his workshop.

Materials

Bob Basset's primary material is leather. He also uses metal, stone, wood, bone, ceramic, and glass. The artist's main criteria for leather is that it has an "ethical origin" and is "a product of animal husbandry," not only because all the workshop processes depend on the quality of material, but to show his respect towards the material. The studio uses leather from many countries, including from Ukraine, Belarus, Italy, and Africa.

Objects d'art

Masks

Masks have become Bob Basset's specialty. He makes unique leather masks for use in a number of different fields such as fashion, music, cinema, and so on.

The studio has more than a thousand masks in its portfolio, including masks representing demons, zombies, unicorns, aliens, various animals, and dragons. Bob Basset created a number of different skull and horse masks, as well as a mask with horns that look like claws. Some of the Bob Basset masks are his famous masks for Sid Wilson, the Plague Doctor mask, the Cthulhu mask, the David Michelangelo mask, a mask that looks like Darth Vader’s helmet, and an Orthodox Van Helsing (which has a speaker to scare away demons). All of the Bob Basset masks have a complicated structure; some of them have built-in cooling systems, 3D-glasses, and lasers.

Bob Basset has made masks for bikers, a motorcycle helmet for a private collection, and a biker's mask for the Iron Custom Motocycles speed record project Inspirium.

Dragons

Co-founder, Oleg Petrov, has been fascinated by dragons since childhood, so dragons became one of the main subjects manufactured by the Bob Basset studio. A number of dragon pieces were created throughout the years, including bags, helmets, toys, masks, and costumes.

In 2006, the studio presented the Dragon Backpack, which became famous on the internet. As of 2018, twelve years after the first presentation, the backpack remains still popular among leather-item lovers. In 2015, the news about Bob Basset's Dragon Backpack replica was reposted nearly 100 000 times and liked around 44 000 times on Facebook.

Eventually, the original backpack was sold to a private collection and Bob Basset created a replica that also received wide discussion.

Other items

Over the years, the Bob Basset studio produced a collection of "strange artwork" for example, a device that helps one to connect with aliens, a system of hiding places for one's house, and a turtle which served as a knife container. At some point, the studio created sapphire knives and leather wings with a wingspan of four meters.
   
In 2011, the studio created leather Christmas tree decorations in steampunk style.

History

Oleg's influence

The Bob Basset brand was founded in 1989 as a leather workshop in Kharkiv, Ukraine by brothers Oleg and Serhii Petrov. The studio was named after Oleg Petrov's dog, a basset hound named Bob.

Before "Bob Basset" was used as the studio name, it was a nickname for older Oleg. Oleg, whose first specialty was metallurgy, started to work with leather as a teenager. The book Two Little Savages, by Ernest Thompson Seton, inspired him to work with leather, and he started to sew Indian clothes at about twelve years old. He made his first leather boots at the age of fourteen. In adulthood, Oleg continued to make his own footwear, and became interested in creating leather accessories, including women's hand-bags. By the time he helped found Bob Basset, he had worked with leather for twenty years, learning the craft from old books on leather, chemistry, and technology.

The workshop officially became the Bob Basset art studio in the 2000s. From the beginning, Oleg was the lead founder. He wanted the studio to create items that "have never been made before." To ensure his creations were unique and came solely from his imagination, he lived in isolation from art books, television, blogs, and even people.

Early history: the first decade

In 1988, when the celebration of Halloween was just becoming common in Soviet Union through American movies, the Petrov brothers created around ten carnival masks, which they later sold. In 1989, the workshop turned its attention to work on leather accessories.

At first, the Petrov brothers didn't have enough money to afford materials, but they kept working to achieve their "ambitious goals." By 2001, with initial capital of $50, the workshop started to make leather items for Ukrainian sex shops. The internet was young at the time, so the brothers had to promote their products in person. Serhii Petrov travelled all around Ukraine to promote and deliver their leather creations. The studio was then the only local leather-item manufacturers that supplied sex shops.

Eventually, the Ukrainian media became interested in Bob Basset products, but Oleg Petrov felt that working in the sex industry was "not the best way to achieve immortality," so he started to sell products on eBay instead of proceeding as a supplier.

The eBay shop attracted an audience, and the brothers started to work on commission. Later, Bob Basset products were also available for purchase on Makers Market, another online handcraft marketplace. In 2006, the brothers displayed their creations to the public on a Bob Basset account on LiveJournal, a global blogging platform.

In April 2007, Bob Basset presented the Cthulhu mask.

With the growing popularity on the internet, Bob Basset started gaining fans and clients. By 2008, the studio started to be recognized internationally with a number of articles and mentions of their work in magazines and online.

In 2009, Bob Basset presented the leather Paw Shoes and "lace-up, claw-bearing" mittens. Photos of the Bob Basset Paw Shoes were published in The New York Times Magazine.

In 2009, the studio made seven or eight masks for the Carl Erik Rinsch short movie called The Gift, which was part of a collaboration of five filmmakers named Parallel Lines and presented by the Ridley Scott Associates production company (RSA Films). However, only four of the masks were eventually used in the project.

History: the second decade

Serhii's leadership

Oleg Petrov died in 2011, and his younger brother Serhii continued the business alone. Twelve years younger than his brother, Serhii also chose the manufacture of leather items as his main occupation. In the 1990s, he tried a number of other jobs, including establishing businesses and working in promotion. His work on Bob Basset goods became a "hobby," but later he returned to the art studio full-time.

After his brother's death, Serhii Petrov intended to produce all the artwork himself. He refused to leave the original Bob Basset workshop, which was located in the garage of a private house on the outskirts of Kharkiv. Serhii became the face of the brand and the main artist behind it. He ran the business, controlled the manufacture process, produced ideas, and managed staff.

Serhii Petrov considers himself to be the founder of the original concept of the steampunk gas mask. When the brothers started to list their creations on eBay, there were around 700 items under the term "steampunk." Bob Basset successfully distanced their inventory from these items by pioneering “steampunk gas mask” term.

Global recognition

In autumn 2010, Vogue Hommes published a ten-page photo shoot with models styled by Panos Yiapanis. Bob Basset leather masks were worn by every model, complementing outfits provided by fashion brands Yves Saint Laurent, Givenchy, Prada, Marc Jacobs, Louis Vuitton, and others.

In 2010, Italian clothing designer Riccardo Tisci ordered Bob Basset masks for the 2011 Givenchy Spring-Summer Men's Collection fashion show. To make the seven masks in time, the studio worked around the clock for four days.

The collection, with Bob Basset leather masks as the main accessory, was presented at the Paris Fashion Week. Later, the masks were used at a photo shoot for Givenchy promotion posters and were displayed in Givenchy boutique showcases.

After the partnership with Givenchy, Bob Basset became recognized all around the world. Only after becoming popular abroad, did the studio gain recognition on the same level in its native country, Ukraine.

Further partnerships

In 2012, Bob Basset partnered on projects with two Ukrainian brands: sasha.kanevski and L'UVE (partnering with the designer Valeria Kovalska).

In 2017, Bob Basset masks were used in a fashion show by the Italian brand Balossa. The collection was presented at the Lviv Fashion Week 2017, and all the models' looks were complemented with Bob Basset masks and accessories. A year later, Bob Basset provided masks for the shoe brand Ganor Dominic's photo shoot.

Bob Basset worked on a gaming design for the international company Plarium, which has an office in Kharkiv, Ukraine.

History: the third decade

Bob Basset art studio during the Russian invasion

At the beginning of the Russian invasion, Serhii Petrov was forced to evacuate from Kharkiv to Lviv with a minimal amount of tools and equipment. According to him, the Kharkiv workshop was not damaged by shelling, but it is dangerous to work in a city that is shelled almost every day. In Lviv, he created a workshop, continues to make masks and helps the army - he collects money for gas masks, established the production of body armor. "There is no place in the world where it would be as good for me to live and work as in Kharkiv. I will definitely return to Kharkiv", says Petrov.

Bob Basset provided art objects as lots for two auctions of war trophies and art "History in Objects", which took place in the Lviv Municipal Art Center in the summer of 2022. One of the objects was sold for UAH 55,000 (USD 1900 approx.) at the starting price UAH 29,542, becoming the most expensive lot of the first auction. In total, UAH 205,510 was collected at the auction. The funds were directed to the UAID charity fund for the purchase of needed items for the front line.

During the war, Serhiy Petrov began to use spent bullet cartridges from the battlefield as elements of masks. "Each piece has a story. Maybe it was someone’s last bullet", said Petrov during an interview for the New York Times.

In 2022, Serhiy Petrov was included in the anthology of modern Ukrainian visual art "Unknown Art. Artistic reflections. Ukraine after 2013" by Olesya Gerashchenko (Shambur), published by “Osnovy” publishing house. The collection with 100 reproductions and 50 interviews with artists, art critics and curators included "Maidan Mask", created by the studio in 2013.

Controversies

In 2012, Bob Basset's steampunk gas mask was plagiarized by the company Design Toscano, which put their version up for sale on eBay as an originally designed product. Later, Design Toscano apologized, blaming a designer who stole the idea. Eventually, Bob Basset received a royalties for the design.

Arenas of success

Despite the fact that Bob Basset masks and items are often used in various industries, Petrov himself perceives his work and items as art, rather than fashion accessories.

Recognition

In 2016, Vogue International listed Bob Basset as one of nine revolutionary Ukrainian designers. The studio's art was published in the magazines Vogue International, The New York Times Fashion Magazine, WAD, Vice U.K., Bizarre, METCHA, L'Uomo Vogue, INSIDE Artzine, Trendson, and others.

William Gibson, who is credited as the founder of the steampunk style, declared Bob Basset's products "almost the only existing model of the genre." After receiving Gibson's endorsement, people started to refer to Bob Basset as the "guru of the contemporary steampunk."

The studio once ran a private exhibition for filmmaker and artist David Lynch when he visited Kyiv, Ukraine. Lynch greatly appreciated the exhibition.

Another Bob Basset customer is Cory Doctorow, the post-cyberpunk and science fiction author and a co-editor of the blog Boing Boing. A number of Bob Basset pieces are owned by Garick Karogodskiy, a businessman, writer, and blogger from Kyiv, and Evgeny Chichvarkin, a Russian businessman and entrepreneur.

Bob Basset masks are often bought for the international and Ukrainian private collections. As of 2017, the biggest Ukrainian Bob Basset collection, containing 22 masks, belonged to Kiyv restaurateur, Dmitry Borisov.

A number of masks belong to an international collection of Richard Neufeld (a coordinator of design and visual art program in Canadian Cambrian College), and in 2018 were provided by the owner for the Curious Couture: Fab Fashions & Personal Collections exhibition in Sudbury, Canada.

Fashion shows and collections

In 2013, Bob Basset masks were presented at the Berlin Fashion Week show in partnership with Ukrainian brand sasha.kanevski.

In 2014, Bob Basset presented a new collection of masks and accessories called "Mashrabiya" during the Ukrainian Fashion Week. The main element of the collection was a pattern from traditional Arabic architecture. Beside masks, the collection included leather accessories such as bags, clutches, bracelets, and iPad cases.

The next year, a new Bob Basset mask collection named "ΣΑΛΩΜΗΣ" was presented at the Ukrainian Fashion Week 2015. The collection consisted of five items that could be used as both masks and handbags.

In 2015–2016, Bob Basset created ironic collections of masks for eggs. A 2015 collection, named "Survivors" portrayed eggs that survived Easter wearing mini-versions of masks created in previous years. The 2016 egg-mask collection, named "Calvary" (or Golgotha), consisted of mini-versions of other Bob Basset masks meaningful to the creator, and portrayed the participants of an "evangelical crucifixion." In 2019, as the World Record Egg became popular around the world, Bob Basset's egg exposition gained new meaning.

In 2017, Bob Basset masks were exhibited in the Italian clothing brand Balossa's collection at the Lviv Fashion Week fashion show.

In 2019, Bob Basset presented his new collection "Turnskin."

Special projects

Bob Basset created a mask for a bull terrier dog once, but later gave up on the idea, seeing it as animal abuse. Later the idea was re-imagined into a leather steampunk dog, which was a popular item in many exhibitions. Serhii Petrov cherished it as a piece of art and as a memory, for it was based on a real-life dog, which Serhii's family rescued from the street.

In 2016, Bob Basset created a biker's mask for an Iron Custom Motocycles speed record motorcycle project called Inspirium.

During the Ukrainian revolution of 2013–2014, Serhii Petrov took part in several pro-Ukrainian protests in Kharkiv. These events influenced both his politics and his art. "Before 2014 I did not give any importance to my origins: nothing, in my art, spoke of Ukraine. At the time I just wanted to be an artist of the world. After that year, being Ukrainian took on a completely different weight. My national identity has started to make itself felt more and more, even if what I do continues to have a global character" says Petrov. At the end of 2013, Bob Basset presented the Mask of Maidan, which looks like a baton smashing the face of its wearer. The photo of the mask was published in Dazed magazine.

The Mask of Maidan became a symbol of political repressions in Ukraine. It was dedicated to the media representatives who worked in war zones and suffered injuries there. In 2014, the mask was auctioned on eBay, and the studio donated all of the profit to Hromadske.TV, which, in Petrov's opinion, was one of the last representatives of independent Ukrainian journalism. During the Ukrainian revolution and the beginning of the Made in Ukraine Movement, Bob Basset received another spur of recognition in its native country.

In 2016, Bob Basset partnered with another Ukrainian artist for the first time: Gamlet Zinkivskyi. The project was a video called "Secret Room" that was presented at the Addiction a L’oeuvre festival in Paris.

During the 2020 COVID-19 pandemic, Bob Basset created a design for a new mask that could be used as a temporary replacement for or in addition to virus-protection masks. The mask's design is simple, and making it requires only five minutes, an A4 paper sheet, several stationery rubber bands, and scissors. Serhii Petrov said that his mask could be useful in prevention of the virus' spread through airborne droplets if a sick person wore it, but emphasized that it didn't directly protect people from the virus.

Music videos and musicians

In 2013, Sid Wilson from the band Slipknot asked the studio to make him a mask for his live performances. As of 2020, Bob Basset has made seven custom masks for the Slipknot turntablist to wear in music videos and during live performances. All of the Sid Wilson masks are unique; in creating "fan versions," Serhii Petrov made intentional changes, discussed with customers before purchase. In 2022, Bob Basset continued their collaboration with Slipknot and created a new mask for Slipknot's Sid Wilson. The mask was specially designed for the release of the single The Dying Song, which will be included on the new album The End, So Far. In a new look, Wilson stole the show with his appearance in "The Dying Song (Time to Sing)” music video, Revolver admits. According to Serhiy Petrov, Sid Wilson now has about 15 Bob Basset masks in his collection, but only 7 of them he ordered directly from the art studio: he bought all the others on the secondary market.

In 2013, a Bob Basset mask appeared in Avril Lavigne's music video of the song  "Rock'N'Roll."

Zac Baird, a keyboardist from the rock band Korn, wore Bob Basset masks during his performances. A mask in the form of a horse head was created in 2010 for him. In 2013, a Bob Basset mask appeared in the Metallica movie Metallica: Through the Never. The studio's masks were also used in music videos of the Otep and Tantric bands.

In 2016, Bob Basset masks were used for a photo project shot by the photographer Dmitry Komissarenko in Design Scene magazine. The masks were worn by the duet Beissoul & Einius.

In 2018, Bob Basset masks became the key accessory in the duo's new music video for the song "Rooftops."

In 2020, Bob Basset masks "Steam Vibes" and "Loudspeaker Master" were used in a music video for the song "Flames" by British pop-singer Zayn featuring British musicians Jungleboi and Dutch DJ R3hab.

Swedish rock band Ghost has ordered 8 masks from Bob Basset for the Imperatour 2022 world tour. Products in the form of gas masks are created in a style close to steampunk from leather, brass and horns (they were made from real cow horns). The studio for the first time made copies of one product, Serhii Petrov says, because Ghost required 8 custom-made masks. Also, two-meter dragon wings were made by Bob Basset for the soloist of the band.

Movies

Bob Basset studio items are often used in the cinematic world. The masks were used in a promo for the American TV show The Last Ship; Hollywood actress Elizabeth Banks used a mask from the collection "Mashrabiya" in her photo shoot for the Flaunt Magazine in 2014; and a mask was made for the main character in a New Zealand movie, The Dwarves of Demrel.

In 2009, Carl Erik Rinsch used Bob Basset masks in a short movie called The Gift, a Parallel Lines project produced by the Ridley Scott Associates (RSA Films) production company. Bob Basset masks were also used in Michael Bay productions.

Exhibitions

Bob Basset art has been presented all over Europe, in the US and in the U.K. Petrov visited and exhibited in Paris, New York, London, Milan, Lima (Peru), Seoul, Tokio, Beijing, Hong Kong, Kyiv, Kharkiv, Donetsk and many other cities.

As most Bob Basset pieces have been purchased by international collectors, it wasn't easy to arrange an exhibition in Ukraine, but in 2017, Bob Basset hosted a preview of the studio's first ever retrospective exhibition, Entity, in parfum büro gallery in Kyiv, Ukraine. Later the same year, the exhibition was displayed at the Bereznitsky Aesthetics gallery in Kyiv. Many of the exhibited items were borrowed for display from private collections in Paris, New York, Tokio, Milan, Seoul, and London.

Also in 2017, Bob Basset was first exhibited in the studio's native city, Kharkiv, Ukraine. The special exhibition, Art&Fashion: New Dimension, was held at the Yermilov Centre during Museum Night, an international project with more than 1,000 world institutions participating. The Bob Basset exhibition was considered one of the main events of the whole Museum Night project, and was available to the public for only one night.

At the exhibition, Bob Basset presented new items–art skulls–made in partnership with Ukrainian artists Gamlet Zinkivskyi and Alina Zamanova as well as different masks from the ΣΑΛΩΜΗΣ collection, Cyber Dog, mini-mummies, and other objects. During the event, Bob Basset and Gamlet Zinkivskyi announced their future joint exhibition Objects.

In 2018, Peruvian artist Conrad Florez invited Bob Basset and Gamlet Zinkivskyi to bring their art to an exhibition in Lima, Peru. Ukrainian artists took part in the exhibition negro at the Monumental Callao Art center alongside Conrad Florez and another artist, Andrea Barreda. Bob Basset presented six masks in  Lima. Later, a local gallery owner purchased both Bob Basset and Zinkivskyi pieces.

Bob Basset gifted two masks to Conrad Florez, who painted them in his style. These masks, which Petrov called "a unique example of Ukrainian-Peruvian art," were also exhibited at the Lima exhibition. The Ukrainian artists took part in a photo project on Lima streets called Carnavale.

In 2018, the first joint exhibition of Bob Basset and Gamlet Zinkivskyi, Objects, took place in the Yermilov Centre in the artists' native city Kharkiv, Ukraine. More than 2,000 people visited the exhibition during the first weekend, and more than 15,000 people visited during the whole run making it the most visited exhibition in the history of the art center at the time.

The exhibition was created in the "ready-made" style which is aimed at "bringing the object from non-artistic space to the artistic and changing the perception of it." Bob Basset presented nineteen leather masks and a steampunk dog. Their "Secret Room" video was displayed. Visitors could "try on" some of Bob Basset masks via a unique construction of mirrors with holes in them etched by amalgam that allowed people looking at them to see their bodies and Bob Basset masks instead of their faces – the first time Petrov displayed his masks in this way. Another exhibition area allowed people to shoot an art object from a rifle as a part of a social experiment. A Bob Basset mask and two of Zinkivskyi's graphic portraits were the targets. Later, the same year, Bob Basset and Zinkivskyi presented the exhibition in the Art Jump gallery, in Poltava, Ukraine.

In 2019, a part of the Objects exhibition and the Bob Basset installation "Calvary" ("Golgotha") were displayed at the Ukrainian Fashion Week. This was the artists' first time at the UFW as a part of partnered project and the first time Bob Basset presented the "Calvary" installation in public.

List of Exhibitions

See also 

 Kharkiv
 Givenchy
 Riccardo Tisci
 William Gibson 
 Cory Doctorow

References

Literature cited

External links 

 Bob Basset's Official Website
 Bob Basset and Panos Yiapanis' photo project for Vogue Hommes International
 Bob Basset's masks at the Givenchy Men Spring-Summer Collection 2011

Artists from Kharkiv
Ukrainian designers
Ukrainian fashion designers
Leatherworkers
Leather goods
Ukrainian contemporary artists
Living people
1976 births